John Winthrop Sears (December 18, 1930 – November 4, 2014) was an American lawyer, historian and politician.  His great-great-grandfather was David Sears II. He was the grandson of seven time National tennis champion Richard Dudley Sears and the first cousin once removed of Eleonora Sears. Sears was an alumnus of St. Mark's School, Harvard College during which he spent a year as a Rhodes Scholar at Oxford University, and Harvard Law School.

He served as a member of the Massachusetts House of Representatives from 1965–1968, Sheriff of Suffolk County, Massachusetts from 1968–1969. He was Metropolitan District Commissioner from 1970–1975, He was Chairman of the Massachusetts Republican Party from 1975–1976. He ran for municipal office and served as a Boston City Councilor from 1980–1981. He was a candidate for Mayor of Boston in 1967, Secretary of the Commonwealth in 1978. He was the Republican candidate for Governor of Massachusetts in 1982. Sears received one vote for the vice presidential nomination at the 1976 Republican National Convention.

In 2012 the longtime party activist defined himself as "an old-fashioned, center-fielding Republican." He died at his home in Boston on November 4, 2014.

References

External links

1930 births
2014 deaths
American brokers
Boston City Council members
Harvard Law School alumni
Massachusetts Republican Party chairs
Massachusetts lawyers
Sheriffs of Suffolk County, Massachusetts
Republican Party members of the Massachusetts House of Representatives
Lawyers from Boston
American stockbrokers
20th-century American lawyers
20th-century American politicians
Candidates in the 1982 United States elections
Harvard College alumni
St. Mark's School (Massachusetts) alumni